Major Robert Stuart (c.1812 – 17 June 1901) was a British army officer and diplomat who served in Eastern Europe and the Caribbean.

Early life and family
Stuart was born in Ireland in about 1812 to Thomas Stuart (of Whitehall, County Clare, and Lifford, County Limerick, the alleged illegitimate son of Thomas Smyth and brother of Charles "Hindoo" Stuart). One of his eight brothers was the surgeon and artist James Stuart.

On 2 June 1842 he married Elizabeth Sarah Cathcart, youngest daughter of the Hon. and Rev. Archibald Hamilton Cathcart and Frances Henrietta Fremantle and granddaughter of Charles Cathcart, 9th Lord Cathcart. They had no children.

Two of his nephews, William Horwood Stuart and Charles Leader Justice Stuart, the sons of his brother the Rev. William Stuart (Vicar of Mundon and Rector of Hazeleigh in Essex), also entered the diplomatic service and served around the Black Sea, although both also had their careers cut short: Charles drowned in the Danube at Brăila in Romania in 1885 and William was murdered at Batum in Georgia in 1906. Another nephew, the Rev. Robert Stuart King, was a clergyman and football player.

Military and diplomatic career
Stuart purchased an ensign in the 44th Foot in 1834. Later promoted lieutenant, he exchanged into the 7th Foot in 1838 and purchased a captaincy in 1842. He exchanged into the 41st Foot in 1851 and retired in 1852.

During in the Crimean War, however, he rejoined the army, rising to the rank of major and serving on the staff of General Fenwick Williams. He remained in the region after the war. In 1858 he was appointed Vice-Consul at Volos, and in 1860 was sent to investigate the condition of Christians in Thessaly and Epirus. In 1861 he became Consul in Albania, based in Janina. In 1873 he was made Consul-General for the Russian ports in the Black Sea and the Sea of Azof, and was based at Odessa – at this time his private secretary was his nephew, William Horwood Stuart.

In 1874 he became Consul-General in Haiti and Chargé d'Affaires for the Dominican Republic, and in 1876 he helped to save the life of the President of Haiti, Michel Domingue, during an uprising. He was also the author of a confidential report sent to the Foreign Office entitled "The People of the Haitian Republic", which may have been an unacknowledged source for the memoirs of his predecessor, Spenser St. John, which were published in 1884.

Stuart retired in 1883 to Breton Lodge, Leamington Spa, where he died on 17 June 1901 at the age of 88; he is buried in Leamington Cemetery.

Other activities
In 1856, Stuart led an expedition to the summit of Mount Ararat, along with Major Alick Fraser, the Rev. Walter Thursby, James Theobald and John Evans.

He was the author of various papers, including:
 1868: "The Vlakhs of Mount Pindus", Transactions of the Ethnological Society of London, vol. 6, pp. 311–327
 1869: "On the Physical Geography and Natural Resources of Epirus", Journal of the Royal Geographical Society of London, vol. 39, pp. 276–295
 1877: "The Ascent of Mount Ararat in 1856", Proceedings of the Royal Geographical Society, vol. 21, pp. 77–92
 1878: "Haïti or Hispaniola", Journal of the Royal Geographical Society of London, vol. 48, pp. 234–278

References

Year of birth uncertain
1810s births
1901 deaths
British Army personnel of the Crimean War
Royal Fusiliers officers
41st Regiment of Foot officers
44th Regiment of Foot officers
19th-century British diplomats
British consuls
Ambassadors of the United Kingdom to Haiti
Ambassadors of the United Kingdom to the Dominican Republic
Fellows of the Royal Geographical Society
Mount Ararat
People from Leamington Spa